Yeh Wada Raha is a 2003 Pakistani Urdu language film directed by Sangeeta.

Story
Zara Sheikh plays the character of a girl-next-door living with her blind mother. Nirma plays the daughter of a mafia boss, who loses his life to Shaan's gun-toting adventures one day. Saud is the honest journalist (with a Mr. Ripley look) and Arbaz Khan is the useless son-in-law (ghar damad) who has vengeance and hatred for almost everyone without a reason. The characters are baseless with hardly any convincing reason to their presence in the film. And most of them roll over dead in the gruesome action clashes in the film. But before dying they do manage to take the time out to sing and dance with campfires, waterfalls, and Karachi's beaches as some of the backdrops.

Full cast
 Shaan
 Arbaaz Khan
 Zara Sheikh
 Nirma
 Pervaiz Kaleem
 Nadeem
 Saud
 Shafqat Cheema

Accolades

References

2003 films
2000s Urdu-language films
Pakistani action films
Films directed by Sangeeta (Pakistani actress)